Donald or Don McAllister may refer to:

Don McAllister, footballer
Donald McAllister (cricketer), Australian cricketer
Don McAllister (publisher)
Donald Evan McAllister, Canadian ichthyologist

See also
Donald MacAlister, physician and Chancellor of Glasgow University